See also Dublin Senior Football Championship

The Dublin Intermediate Football Championship is an annual Gaelic Athletic Association competition organised by Dublin GAA between second-tier Gaelic football clubs in County Dublin, Ireland.

Qualification for subsequent competitions

Leinster Intermediate Club Football Championship
The Dublin IFC winner qualifies for the Leinster Intermediate Club Football Championship. It is the only team from Dublin to qualify for this competition. The Dublin IFC winner may enter the Leinster Intermediate Club Football Championship at either the preliminary round or the quarter-final stage. For example, Ballyboughal played in the 2017 Leinster IFC final but lost to the club of Wexford All Star Mattie Forde. This was the first appearance of the Dublin IFC representative at that stage of the competition since 2013, when St Olaf's played in the Leinster IFC final.

2007's winning club, Fingal Ravens, went on to win the Leinster IFC final.

All-Ireland Intermediate Club Football Championship
The Dublin IFC winner — by winning the Leinster Intermediate Club Football Championship — may qualify for the All-Ireland Intermediate Club Football Championship, at which it would enter at the semi-final stage, providing it hasn't been drawn to face the British champions in the quarter-finals.

Dublin Senior Football Championship
The winner of the Dublin IFC also qualifies to play in the Dublin Senior Football Championship.

History
In 2018, a second Intermediate Championship was added. The new championship was entitled the Dublin All County Intermediate Football Championship.

The 2018 Dublin Intermediate Championship consisted of 17 teams and did not include any club that also had a team in the senior championship. The all county championship is an intermediate championship that consists of clubs that are also at senior level.

Top winners

Finals listed by year

All County Championship
The Dublin All County Intermediate Football Championship which began in 2018, is a championship consisting of 12 clubs that have teams in the senior championship but also have a side that is at an intermediate level. The winners of this championship do not progress to the senior championship as they already have a team at that level. The championship begins with four groups of three teams in a league format. The top two teams in the leagues progress to the knockout stage and opposition is decided through an open draw. The teams that finish at the bottom of each league must compete in a series of games to prevent relegation to the Dublin Junior Football Championship 1 (all county).

Final

Notes and references

Intermediate
Intermediate Gaelic football county championships